Vista High School may refer to:

United States
Vista High School (Lynwood, California), in Los Angeles County
Vista High School (Vista, California), in San Diego County
Vista High School (Arizona), in Yuma, Arizona

Others
Vista High School (Cape Town), in South Africa

See also
Vistas High School Program, in Harris County, Texas